Kermania is a genus of moths belonging to the family Tineidae.

Species
Kermania pistaciella Amsel, 1964  (from Iran and Turkey)

References

Original publication: nhm database: Amsel, 1964 . Beitr. naturk. Forsch. SüdwDtl. 23 : 107

Hieroxestinae